Concha y Toro is the largest producer and exporter of wines from Latin America and one of the 10 largest wine companies in the world, with more than 33 millions of cases sold per year in 2014, distributed in 135 countries. Concha y Toro Winery is located in Santiago de Chile, but the company has vineyards in Chile, Argentina and the United States, with more than 10.000 cultivates hectares in 2016. Casillero del Diablo and Don Melchor wines have international recognition. As of 2010 is one of the official sponsors of the English football club Manchester United F. C.

History

19th century: aristocratic origin 

The Concha y Toro Vineyard was founded by Don Melchor de Santiago Concha y Toro, VII Marquess of Casa Concha and ex-Minister of Finance, and his wife, Emiliana Subercaseaux, in 1883. To start the winery, he brought grape varieties from the Bordeaux region in France. The grapes that he brought were: Cabernet Sauvignon, Sauvignon Blanc, Semillon, Merlot, and Carmenère.

Not only the origins of Concha y Toro are connected to Chilean nobility and aristocracy. Currently the Viña Concha y Toro continues in the sphere of the Marquesado de Casa Concha, and is additionally controlled by the Guilisasti and Larraín families. Nowadays the directory of the company is composed by the present Marquess of Casa Concha, a Chilean diplomat and ambassador Mariano Fontecilla de Santiago-Concha, great-grandson of the founder. In 1999, the company's president Alfonso Larraín Santa María claimed the title of Marquess of Larraín in Spain. His mother, the current Marchioness, gave Larraín the power to claim the title.

Vineyards and factories of Concha y Toro in Pirque, Santiago Metropolitan Region, are connected by roads with names such as Marqués de Casa Concha or Conde de la Conquista, noble titles connected to the history of the company.

20th century: expansion 
The vineyard was incorporated as a stock company in 1923 and shares were sold in the Santiago Stock Exchange, until today. Concha y Toro began exporting wine in March 1933 to the port of Rotterdam, the Netherlands. In 1950, the winery began to acquire more vineyards and also began the process of adapting its business to new markets and meeting a higher demand.

In 1966, the Casillero del Diablo brand, the company's hallmark, was inaugurated, and in 1987 the company's first ultra-premium wine, Don Melchor, was launched. In these years the company begins to expand. Viña Maipo, was acquired in 1968; Viña Cono Sur, created in 1993; Trivento Bodegas in Argentina, founded in 1996; or the joint venture signed with Château Mouton Rothschild, for the production of Viña Almaviva, founded in 1997, among other.

In 1971, Eduardo Guilisasti Tagle became chairman of the board, who succeeded in expanding the company. In 1987, after partnering with U.S. importer Banfi Vintners, the company started to incorporate more advanced technology in all of its production stages. It also started using small French oak barriques. In 1994, shares of Viña Concha started trading on the New York Stock Exchange, until his cessation in 2018.

21st century: globalization 
At the beginning of the 21st century, the company internationalized operations: in 2001 opened a trade, logistics and distribution office in United Kingdom, and then offices in other 11 countries: Brazil, Canada, China, United States, Finland, Japan, Mexico, Norway, Singapore, South Africa and Sweden, which would join the existing offices in Chile and Argentina. In 2010 a sponsorship agreement was signed with the English club Manchester United F.C. In this respect, Manchester United 2020 sponsorship director, Sean Jefferson, said: "Manchester United's relationship with Casillero del Diablo has been one of the most extensive and successful partnerships we ever had. The synergy between the two brands have led to a natural alliance", especially due to equivalence of their symbols and distinctive seals.

In 2011 Concha y Toro bought in United States Fetzer Vineyards, for a value of US$238 million. The transaction included the buy of various Fetzer subsidiaries vineyards, such as Bonterra Vineyards, Five River Wines, Bel Arbor Winery, Jekel Vineyards, and Little Black Dress Wines, which became property of Concha y Toro.

More recently Concha y Toro has advertising campaigns in Discovery Channel, and subsidiary Trivento Vineyards is sponsorship in the Major League Soccer, and has reached sponsorship agreements with football club Inter Miami CF.

Grape varieties
Concha y Toro produces several varietals:
 White: Chardonnay, Sauvignon blanc, Semillon, Gewürztraminer.
 Red: Cabernet Sauvignon, Merlot, Carmenère

Filial vineyards

Logistics centers

Trademarks

Awards and honours 
 The World's Most Admired Wine Brand, in 2011, 2012 and 2013; second place in 2014, 2017 and 2018, according Drink International.
 The Americas Most Admired Wine Brand, between 2011 and 2019, according Drink International.
 The World's Most Powerful Wine Brand, in 2014 and 2015, according to Intangible Business.
 One of the only three wineries to be included in the top 100 of the best wineries in the world without interruption, according to Wine & Spirits Magazine.
 Best International Drink Company of the year, in 2015 and 2016, awarded by the Drinks Business Awards.
 Casillero del Diablo, Second Most Powerful Wine Brand in the World, in 2018, 2019 and 2020, according to Wine Intelligence.

References

External links 
 https://conchaytoro.com/en/
 http://www.casillerodeldiablo.com/
 http://www.fronterawines.com/

Wineries of Chile
Wine brands
Food and drink companies of Chile
Food and drink companies established in 1883
1883 establishments in Chile
Chilean brands
Companies listed on the Santiago Stock Exchange